The Etherington Formation is a geologic formation in Alberta. It preserves fossils dating back to the Carboniferous period.

See also

 List of fossiliferous stratigraphic units in Alberta

References

Carboniferous Alberta